Dębica  is a village in the administrative district of Gmina Rymań, within Kołobrzeg County, West Pomeranian Voivodeship, in north-western Poland.

The village has a population of 210.

See also 

 History of Pomerania

References

Villages in Kołobrzeg County